Badminton at the 2014 African Youth Games took place from 22 to 27 May 2014 in Otse Police College, Gaborone, Botswana. There are 6 events contested in this sport.

Medal summary

Medal table

References
Results and medals

2014 African Youth Games
African Youth Games
African Youth Games
African Youth Games